The Nubian Museum (officially the International Museum of Nubia) is an archaeological museum located in Aswan, Upper Egypt. Dedicated to Nubian culture and civilization, it was inaugurated on November 23, 1997, and was awarded the Aga Khan Award for Architecture in 2001.

Building

The Nubian Museum covers an area of 50,000 square meters, 7,000 of which are devoted to the building, while the rest are devoted to gardens and other public spaces. The building has three floors for displaying and housing, in addition to a library and information center. The largest part of the museum is occupied by the monumental pieces, reflecting phases of the development of Nubian culture and civilization.

Contents

Three thousand pieces of Egyptian antiquities, representing various ages; Geological, Pharaonic, Roman, Coptic and Islamic, were registered. The open-door exhibition includes 90 rare monumental pieces, while the internal halls contain 50 invaluable pieces dating back to pre-historic times, 503 pieces belong to the Pharaonic period, 52 to the Coptic era, 103 to the Islamic age, 140 to the Nubian era, in addition to 360 pieces reflecting the history of Aswan.

Landscape
The Museum is built on a steep cliff, which enables it to embody a full scale design for the Nile river from its origins in Ethiopia and Sudan to Egypt. The edifice is surrounded by a Natural Botanical Garden, which contains a large variety of Egyptian flora.

Administration
Since the museum opening, the administration has kept upgrading their caretakers. The Head Director of Nubia Museum since opening has been Dr.Ossama A.W Abd El Maguid (known as "Ossama Hassoun"). He is an Egyptologist and a member of the International Council of Museums (ICOM) Saving Egyptian Culture Program.

See also
List of museums in Egypt

References

Bibliography
 1982: Nubia Museum, Architectural and Exhibition Program, EAO-UNESCO, Unpublished report.
 1997: Gaballa, Ali Gaballa, Nubia Museum, (Cairo: Ministry of Culture, The Higher Council of Antiquities, Museum Sector, Save Nubia Fund).
 1998: Kaper, Olaf E. The New Nubia Museum of Aswan (http://www.assemblage.group.shef.ac.uk/4/4nubia.html.
 2005: Abdel Wareth Abdel Meguid, O. “The Nubia Museum and Community”, Museum International, (Paris: UNESCO, May,), 225–226.
 2000: Marino Giuseppe, De Simone, Costanza, Nubia Submerged: Through their Eyes with their Own Words. Cairo: Agenzia Italiana. (in cooperazione con Giuseppe Marino) (90 pp.).
 2009: De Simone, Costanza, “The Documentation Center on Nubia at the Nubia Museum of Aswan”. Egyptian and Egyptological Documents, Archives (Università di Milano. Pontetremoli, Milano), 173–178.
 2015: De Simone, Costanza, Nubia and Nubians: The ‘Museumization’ of a Culture. Saarbrücken, Germania: Lambert Academic Publishing (305 pp.).

External links
 An upper Aswan museum, the Nubian Museum. From EgyptSites.

History museums in Egypt
Egyptological collections in Egypt
Open-air museums in Egypt
Aswan
Museums established in 1997
1997 establishments in Egypt
History of Nubia
Ethnic museums in Egypt
Nubians in Egypt